Gentianella sulphurea is a species of plant in the Gentianaceae family. It is endemic to Ecuador.  Its natural habitat is subtropical or tropical high-altitude shrubland.

References

Endemic flora of Ecuador
sulphurea
Vulnerable plants
Taxonomy articles created by Polbot